State Road 244 (NM 244) is a  state highway in northern Otero County, New Mexico, United States, that connects U.S. Route 82 (US 82) in Cloudcroft with U.S. Route 70 (US 70) northeast of Mescalero.

Route description
NM 244 begins at a T intersection on US 82 in the Lincoln National Forest in a narrow part of city limits of Cloudcroft that runs along US 82 and connects the main part of the village with the ski area to the east. (US 82 heads east toward Alamogordo and Tularosa and west toward Mayhill and Artesia.) NM 244 then turns to head east–northeasterly. Along this roughly  section, NM 244 connects with the south end of Observatory Road, the north end of Lincoln Forest Winter Skik, the south ends of La Luz Canyon and Raspberry roads, the north end of Sacramento Mountain Road, the south end of Big Rood Road, and the north end of County Road 7 (Dry Canyon Road), which heads south to end at US 82 in Twin Forks.

Immediately after Dry Canyon Road, NM 244, leaves Lincoln National Forest, enters the Mescalero Apache Reservation, and connects with the southern end of Indian Service Road 10 (which heads north–norhtwesterly to connect with the north end of Indian Service Route 26, before ending at US 70 in Mescalero). As NM 244 continues its northeasterly direction, it begins running roughly parallel with and near the north bank of the Silver Springs Creek for about  before connecting with the north end of Baird Canyon Road and passing just south of Silver Lake. Roughly  farther along its northwesterly course, NM 244 connects with the west end of Indian Service Route 14 and, promptly thereafter, the east end of Indian Service Route 27 (which heads southwesterly to end at Indian Service Route 26). About  later, NM 244, connects with the east end of Indian Service Road 51, and then, approximately  later, connects with the east end of Indian Service Road 16. Roughly  farther along, NM 244 connects with the south end of Indian Service Route 80, followed by the north end of Indian Service Road 49 (which heads southerly to end at Indian Service Road 16). About another mile (0.8 km) on, NM 244 connects with the west end of Indian Service Road 15 (which heads easterly to connect with the north end of Indian Service Road 34 and beyond). After approximately another , NM 244 connects with the north end of Skyline Road and then with the south end of Sanspear Drive  later. (US 70 heads east toward Ruidoso Downs, Glencoe, and Roswell and west toward Mescalero, Bent, and Tularosa.)

Traffic

The New Mexico Department of Transportation (NMDOT) collects data for the State Roads and Local Federal-Aid roads. Traffic is measured in both directions and reported as Annual Average Daily Traffic (AADT). , NM 244 had an AADT of 574, with a nearly 20 percent decrease over the previous two years.

History
NM 244 was created in 1988 as a renumbering of a section of New Mexico State Road 24, along with the renumbering of many other state road sections in the same year.

Major intersections

See also

 List of state roads in New Mexico

Notes

References

External links

244
Transportation in Otero County, New Mexico